Uptown Janesville (formerly Janesville Mall) is an enclosed shopping mall located in Janesville, Wisconsin, United States. Opened in 1973, the mall has more than 68 tenants. The anchor stores are Dick's Sporting Goods, Ulta Beauty, and Kohl's. There are 3 vacant anchor stores that were once Sears, Boston Store, and JCPenney.

Origins
In 1970, developer Roger Benjamin began scouting a site to construct a strip mall featuring Welles, a Midwestern discount department store chain. Flying over southern Wisconsin, he identified acres of open land in the Town of Harmony along Milton Avenue, between the main downtown streets and Interstate 90. Benjamin determined that with nearly 200,000 people, the Janesville trading area had a large enough population and sufficient financial resources to support a mall. Montgomery Ward had already begun to build a store on one of the sites he was considering.

Benjamin and two partners created Janesville Properties Company, which purchased  of land adjoining the Montgomery Ward site, and began planning the development. With the agreement of Montgomery Ward management, Benjamin modified his original plan for a strip mall in favor of an enclosed mall where Welles and Montgomery Ward would serve as anchor stores. Within a year, Rockford-based department store Charles V. Weise (owned by Bergner's) signed on to become a third anchor; its store was located midway between the other department stores, and a prominent central courtyard was constructed outside its entrance. Plans to construct the $10 million enclosed mall were announced in November 1970 with groundbreaking set for spring 1971.

Welles discount store was planned as one of the original anchor stores along with Montgomery Ward and Charles V. Weise; however, the chain's parent company filed for bankruptcy while the mall was still being built. Their space was then given to J. C. Penney, which had to extend into the mall itself.

1970s and 1980s
Janesville Mall opened in September 1973, featuring the three anchor stores and 12 other tenants. Unlike nearby Beloit Plaza in Beloit, the newer mall was enclosed, and thus considered more desirable in Wisconsin's often cold climate. The remaining interior spaces of the mall soon filled up with national chain tenants.

In 1985, Illinois-based Bergner's acquired the Boston Store chain and then re-branded the Charles V. Weise stores as Bergner's. Also in 1985, Montgomery Ward closed and was replaced later that same year by Kohl's.

1990s
The nearby Beloit Plaza began losing stores because of competition from the upgraded Janesville Mall. When Bergner's declared Chapter 11 bankruptcy in 1991, its store at Beloit Plaza was closed, and the Bergner's at Janesville Mall was re-branded to Boston Store. The mall was remodeled again in 1991, this time featuring a brighter, pastel-based color scheme; the fig trees were removed.

Janesville Mall's management approached the Sears chain again in 1996 in a second attempt to bring a Sears anchor to the mall. This time, Sears was offered the opportunity to shutter its Beloit Plaza store in favor of a new store at Janesville Mall; various financial incentives, including tax breaks, were also part of this deal. Sears accepted the offer and, by 1997, a new , two-story Sears was built onto Janesville Mall as a fourth anchor, while the older Beloit Plaza Sears was closed.

In 1998, the mall was acquired by CBL & Associates Properties, Inc., a real estate trust based in Tennessee. That same year, Kohl's expanded its store into what had previously been smaller mall shops. The mall's movie theater closed, with Chuck E. Cheese's taking its place.

2000s and 2010s
Since the addition of the Sears anchor, the mall has been  in size. On May 3, 2014, the Janesville Mall J. C. Penney anchor closed, one of 33 closures nationwide by that chain. In December, 2014, CBL announced plans for a multimillion-dollar renovation of Janesville Mall.<ref>"It's official: Dick's, Ulta and a renovation coming to Janesville Mall". Janesville Gazette, December 15, 2014.</ref> On October 2, 2015, Dick's Sporting Goods opened in 40,000 square feet of the former J. C. Penney space. On July 27, 2018, CBL sold Janesville Mall to Houston-based RockStep Capital for $18 million, after paying $33 million to buy the mall in 1998.

The Boston Store anchor closed in August 2018 as part of the closure of the entire The Bon-Ton department store chain. On November 8, 2018, Sears Holdings announced that the Sears anchor and the Sears Auto Center would be closing in February 2019 which left Dick's Sporting Goods and Kohl's as the only anchors left. Unlike the J. C. Penney and Boston Store anchors, Sears owns both the mall anchor and the Auto Center.  Janesville Mall was renamed to Uptown Janesville in July 2020.

References

Leute, Jim.  "My, How Time Flies". The Janesville Gazette'', February 3, 1997.
"Annual Report 2003" and "Janesville Mall Demographics 2004", from the CBL & Associates Properties, Inc., Website

External links
Uptown Janesville website

Shopping malls established in 1973
Buildings and structures in Janesville, Wisconsin
Shopping malls in Wisconsin
Tourist attractions in Rock County, Wisconsin
1973 establishments in Wisconsin